Ronald Charles "Ron" Stretton (13 February 1930 – 12 November 2012) was a track cyclist from Great Britain, who represented his native country at the 1952 Summer Olympics in Helsinki, Finland. There he won the bronze medal in the men's 4,000 metres team pursuit, alongside Donald Burgess, George Newberry, and Alan Newton. He was born in Epsom, Surrey and died in Toronto, Ontario, Canada.

References

External links
 
 
 

1930 births
2012 deaths
English track cyclists
English male cyclists
Cyclists at the 1952 Summer Olympics
Olympic cyclists of Great Britain
Olympic bronze medallists for Great Britain
Sportspeople from Epsom
Olympic medalists in cycling
Medalists at the 1952 Summer Olympics